Cégénydányád is a village in Szabolcs-Szatmár-Bereg county, in the Northern Great Plain region of eastern Hungary. It is best known for its wine region.

Geography

External links
 

Populated places in Szabolcs-Szatmár-Bereg County